Usulumarru is a village in West Godavari district, Andhra Pradesh, by the Godavari River.

References

Villages in West Godavari district